Kristiina Poska (born 12 July 1978, Türi, Estonia) is an Estonian conductor.

Biography
At age eight, Poska began piano lessons.  She graduated from Türi Music School in piano studies in 1994, and then studied choral conducting at the Georg Ots Tallinn Music College from 1994 to 1998. She continued her choral conducting studies in 2002 at Eesti Muusikaakadeemia (the Estonian Academy of Music and Theatre).  She subsequently moved to Berlin, where she studied at the Universität der Künste (Berlin University of the Arts) with Kai-Uwe Jirka and Jörg-Peter Weigle. From 2004 to 2009, she studied orchestral conducting at the Hochschule für Musik "Hanns Eisler" with Christian Ehwald. In the spring of 2008, she received a scholarship from the Conductors Forum at the German Music Council, where her conducting mentors included Peter Gülke, Reinhard Goebel, and Eri Klas.

In 1998, Poska founded the Estonian choir Nimeta ('No Name'). From 2006 to 2011, she conducted the Cappella Academica symphony orchestra of the Humboldt University of Berlin.  Following engagements at the Komische Oper Berlin in the 2010-2011 season (La Traviata, La Périchole), she served as Erste Kapellmeisterin with the company from 2012 to 2016.

In October 2018, Theater Basel announced the appointment of Kristiina Poska as its next General Music Director (GMD; Generalmusikdirektorin), the first female conductor to hold the post.  She served as GMD of the Theater Basel for the 2019-2020 season.  In March 2019, the Symfonieorkest Vlaanderen (Flanders Symphony Orchestra) announced the appointment of Poska as its next chief conductor, the first female conductor to be named to the post, effective with the 2019-2020 season.  In May 2021, the Latvian National Symphony Orchestra announced the appointment of Poska as its next principal guest conductor, the first female conductor to be named to the post, effective in the autumn of 2021, with an initial contract of two seasons.

Awards
 Orchestra's Preference Award at the Dimitri Mitropoulos International Competition for Conducting in Athens, October 2006
 First prize, 5th Bergische Symphoniker Female Conductors' Competition, May 2007
 Top 3, Donatella Flick Conducting Competition in London (2010)
 German Operetta Prize for Young Conductors (jointly awarded by Leipzig Opera and the Conductor’s Forum of the Deutscher Musikrat)
 Audience prize, Leipziger Volkszeitung
 Third prize and audience prize, Nikolai Malko Conducting Competition, Copenhagen, May 2012
 German Conducting Prize (€35,000 prize money) offered by the German Music Council in cooperation with the Konzerthaus Berlin, April 2013

References

External links

 Official homepage of Kristiina Poska
 Eesti Muusika Infokeskus (Estonian Music Information Centre) Estonian-language page on Kristiina Poska
 HarrisonParrott agency page on Kristiina Poska
 Komische Oper Berlin German-language page on Kristiina Poska

1978 births
Living people
Estonian conductors (music)
Estonian expatriates in Germany
Women conductors (music)
People from Türi
Estonian Academy of Music and Theatre alumni
21st-century conductors (music)
Tallinn Georg Ots Music School alumni